Callaway Went Thataway is a 1951 American comedy western film starring Fred MacMurray, Dorothy McGuire, and Howard Keel. It was written, directed, and produced by Melvin Frank and Norman Panama. Also known as The Star Said No, it is a spoof of the craze generated by the television program Hopalong Cassidy.

Plot
Mike Frye (MacMurray) and Deborah Patterson (McGuire), co-owners of an advertising firm, have a big hit when they recycle some old Western films starring "Smoky" Callaway (Keel) for a new television audience. Tom Lorrison (Fay Roope), the show's sponsor, is eager to make more films, but nobody has seen Smoky in ten years. Under intense pressure to produce the star, Frye hires Smoky's agent, Georgie Markham (Jesse White), to go look for him.

Help comes in the form of a letter from a real cowboy named "Stretch" Barnes (also played by Keel), who complains that his friends keep making fun of him because of his resemblance to Smoky. After one look at the enclosed photograph, Frye and Patterson travel to see him. They talk a reluctant Stretch into impersonating Smoky, telling him that Smoky is dead.

After a dinner with Lorrison and his wife Martha (Natalie Schafer), a big fan of the actor, Frye and Patterson get the go-ahead to launch a marketing campaign. Patterson heads out on a nationwide publicity tour with Stretch. As they spend time together, Stretch falls in love with her, and eventually presents her with an engagement ring. She is reluctant to accept it, but he tells her to keep it and put it on only if she ever decides she loves him back.

Things get sticky when Markham finally finds Smoky in a Mexican bar. He has not changed a bit; he is still a selfish, womanizing drunk. Smoky is uninterested in going back to work, but Markham kidnaps him, and talks him into it on the boat trip back. Frye is not pleased when Smoky shows up in his office, but sees he has no choice. He sends Smoky to a health farm to get back into shape. However, despite strict supervision, Smoky manages to stash bottles of liquor everywhere.

When a woman accosts Stretch on the street and accuses him of not doing anything for needy children, he is moved. After some thought, he secretly hires a lawyer to set up a children's foundation which will receive all of his earnings, except a modest allowance for him (and a wife).

When Smoky and Stretch meet by chance, Stretch discovers he has been duped, and decides to go home. That night, the law firm's west coast representative (an uncredited Hugh Beaumont) shows up with the legal document setting up the charity foundation. Stretch comes up with a plan. With Smoky still out of shape, Frye and Patterson had begged him to make an appearance at the Los Angeles Coliseum. Stretch decides to accept, intending to sign the document in front of 90,000 fans and dignitaries. When Smoky learns of his scheme, he objects; the two men get into a brawl, and Smoky gets knocked out. Frye and Markham try to intervene, and suffer the same fate. When Smoky comes to, he realizes he cannot stop Stretch, so he goes back to Mexico, since he would only get paid a modest salary for a lot of hard work. At the Coliseum, Stretch runs into Patterson, who not only approves of his plan, but is also wearing his ring.

Cast
Fred MacMurray as Mike Frye
Dorothy McGuire as Deborah Patterson
Howard Keel as "Stretch" Barnes / "Smoky" Callaway
Jesse White as Georgie Markham
Fay Roope as Tom Lorrison
Natalie Schafer as Martha Lorrison
Douglas Kennedy as Drunk
Elisabeth Fraser as Marie
John Indrisano as Johnny Terrento (as Johnny Indrisano)
Stan Freberg as Marvin
Don Haggerty as Director Don

Clark Gable, Elizabeth Taylor, and Esther Williams made cameo appearances.

Reception
According to MGM records, the film earned $1,071,000 in the US and Canada, and $267,000 elsewhere, resulting in a loss of $294,000.

References

External links

1951 films
1951 comedy films
1950s satirical films
American black-and-white films
American comedy films
American satirical films
1950s English-language films
Films about actors
Films about television
Films about television people
Films directed by Melvin Frank
Films directed by Norman Panama
Metro-Goldwyn-Mayer films
1950s American films